Christmas with the Rat Pack is a 2002 musical album compiling Christmas songs by Frank Sinatra, Dean Martin, and Sammy Davis Jr.

Track listing
 "I've Got My Love to Keep Me Warm" – Dean Martin
 "Mistletoe and Holly" Frank Sinatra
 "Christmas Time All Over the World" – Sammy Davis Jr.
 "The First Noel" – Frank Sinatra
 "Baby, It's Cold Outside" – Dean Martin
 "I Believe" – Frank Sinatra
 "Silver Bells" – Dean Martin
 "The Christmas Song" – Sammy Davis Jr.
 "Hark! The Herald Angels Sing" – Frank Sinatra
 "Rudolph the Red-Nosed Reindeer" – Dean Martin
 "The Christmas Waltz" – Frank Sinatra
 "Let It Snow! Let It Snow! Let It Snow!" – Dean Martin
 "Have Yourself a Merry Little Christmas" – Frank Sinatra
 Medley: "Peace on Earth"/"Silent Night" – Dean Martin
 "Jingle Bells" – Sammy Davis Jr.
 "White Christmas" – Dean Martin
 "It Came Upon a Midnight Clear" – Frank Sinatra
 "Winter Wonderland" – Dean Martin
 "I'll Be Home for Christmas (If Only in My Dreams)" – Frank Sinatra
 "A Marshmallow World" (live, from The Dean Martin Christmas Show) – Frank Sinatra and Dean Martin
 "Auld Lang Syne" (live) – Frank Sinatra and Dean Martin

Charts

References

External links

Dean Martin albums
Christmas compilation albums
2002 Christmas albums
Christmas albums by American artists
2002 compilation albums
Pop Christmas albums
Compilation albums published posthumously
Collaborative albums
Frank Sinatra compilation albums